Uronema is a genus of green algae, the sole genus in the family Uronemataceae.

References

Chaetophorales genera
Chaetophorales